Mikael Torpegaard was the defending champion but lost in the first round to Lucas Catarina.

Bjorn Fratangelo won the title after defeating Jenson Brooksby 7–5, 6–4 in the final.

Seeds

Draw

Finals

Top half

Bottom half

References

External links
Main draw
Qualifying draw

Cleveland Open - 1
Cleveland Open